Bresničić is a village in the municipality of Prokuplje, Serbia. According to the 2002 census, the village has a population of 261 people. The village is approx. 20 km from Prokuplje, Serbia, the nearest larger city.

References

Populated places in Toplica District